The James A. and Ruth M. Bailey House is a large freestanding limestone mansion located at 10 St Nicholas Place at West 150th Street in the Sugar Hill area of Harlem, Manhattan, New York City. The house was built from 1886 to 1888 and was designed by architect Samuel Burrage Reed in the Romanesque Revival style for circus impresario James Anthony Bailey of the Barnum & Bailey Circus.  When it was constructed there were few other buildings in the area, and as a result, sitting as it does on an escarpment, the Bailey Mansion had a clear view to the east of the Long Island Sound.

History and design
Among the house's numerous design features are numerous unique stained glass mosaic windows, designed and fabricated by Henry Belcher, and the varying kinds of wood throughout each room. The interior is richly paneled in hand-carved timber. The exterior features Flemish-style gables and a corner tower.

Bailey sold the house two years prior to his death and from the 1910s to the 1950s, it was owned by a Bavarian doctor, Franz Koempel. In 1951, the house was purchased by Marguerite Blake, who ran it as the M. Marshall Blake Funeral Home  funeral home until her retirement. In 2000, a fire damaged portions of the house. In late 2008, she brought the house to market, seeking to sell it for $10 million. As of May 2009, it was being listed for $6.5 million.  On August 31, 2009, it was reported that the house sold for $1.4 million, which is only around $170 per square foot. 

In 2014, the house was renovated and cremated remains belonging to the funeral parlor were found in a Harlem storage unit.

The Bailey House was designated a New York City Landmark in 1974, and was added to the National Register of Historic Places in 1980.

Gallery

See also
List of New York City Landmarks
 National Register of Historic Places listings in Manhattan above 110th Street
 1890 House in Cortland NY ("Twin" House)

References 
Notes

External links

Houses on the National Register of Historic Places in Manhattan
Houses completed in 1888
Houses in Manhattan
New York City Designated Landmarks in Manhattan
Harlem
Romanesque Revival architecture in New York City
Gilded Age mansions